Leucoptera albella, the cottonwood leaf miner, is a moth in the family Lyonetiidae. It is known from North America and is probably present throughout the commercial range of cottonwood.

The larvae feed on Populus deltoides. They mine the leaves of their host plant. The mine has the form of a brown, somewhat puffy leaf mine. After the larva finishes feeding, it leaves the mine and seeks out a depressed notch, usually at the midvein of a leaf where it pupates in a white silken cocoon that is overlaid with two transverse bands of silk. Periodic heavy infestations may destroy half the total leaf surface and reduce growth of young cottonwood.

References

Leucoptera (moth)
Moths described in 1871
Moths of North America
Leaf miners